Anthony John Fletcher (born 24 April 1941) is an English historian of the seventeenth century.

His parents were Dr. (Clarence) John Molyneux Fletcher (younger brother of Eric Fletcher, Baron Fletcher) and Isabel Chenevix Trench. His maternal grandfather Reginald Chenevix Trench, who died in the Great War, had a sister Cesca, a Sinn Féin supporter who was at the General Post Office, Dublin during the Easter Rising of 1916. Isabel Fletcher was born in November 1915, shortly before her father's death. Fletcher produced a series of recordings about his Irish forebears for the Irish Life and Lore website.

Dr. John Fletcher, after government service as a research metallurgist at Harwell, became an antiquarian who pioneered the use of dendrochronology in the Research Laboratory for Archaeology and the History of Art at the University of Oxford, dating medieval buildings, structures, and paintings on panel.

Anthony Fletcher was educated at Wellington College from 1954 to 1959, where he was an avid historian, journalist and stamp collector. In spite of his talent, he failed History at O-Level, which he considered "unpassable". On leaving school, he read history from 1959 at Merton College, Oxford, where he was a contemporary of R. I. Moore. At Oxford, he was particularly influenced by WG Hoskins.

He decided to teach history as a career, and spent three years doing so at King's College School, before becoming a lecturer at the University of Sheffield.  He was subsequently appointed as Professor at Durham University, from where he moved to the University of Essex.  In his final post, from 2000 to 2005 he was Director of the Victoria County History. He was President of the Ecclesiastical History Society for 1996–97.

J. P. Kenyon called Fletcher's The Outbreak of the English Civil War "easily the most important book on the Great Rebellion in the past 20 years".

Fletcher's festschrift was published in 2007 by the Cambridge University Press (The Family in Early Modern England, edited by H Berry and E Foyster).

Works

(with Diarmaid MacCulloch) Tudor Rebellions (1st ed., 1968; 2nd ed., 1973; 3rd ed., 1983; 4th ed., 1997; 5th ed., 2008).
The Outbreak of the English Civil War (1981).
History, Society and the Churches (1985).
Gender, Sex, and Subordination in England, 1500–1800 (1999).
Growing Up in England: The Experience of Childhood 1600–1914 (2010).

Notes

1941 births
Living people
English historians
Alumni of Merton College, Oxford
People educated at Wellington College, Berkshire
Presidents of the Ecclesiastical History Society